Augustus Hopkins Strong (3 August 1836 – 29 November 1921) was a Baptist minister and theologian who lived in the United States during the late 19th and early 20th centuries.  His most influential book, Systematic Theology, proved to be a mainstay of Reformed Baptist theological education for several generations.

Early life and education
Augustus Hopkins Strong was born on August 3, 1836, in Rochester, New York. He was a descendant of "Elder John Strong, of Northampton, Massachusetts." His grandfather was a "physician of considerable eminence", who moved from Warren, Connecticut, to Scipio, New York, in 1799, then to Rochester in 1821. His father, Alvah Strong, was the printer of such early Rochester newspapers as the Anti-Masonic Enquirer, the Morning Advertiser, and the Weekly Republican, before becoming the longtime proprietor of The Daily Democrat. Both his father and eldest uncle were deacons of the First Baptist Church of Rochester, and helped found the Rochester Theological Seminary (RTS), in 1850, the institution over which he would later preside. RTS would later become Colgate Rochester Crozer Divinity School.
 

Strong's younger brother, Henry A. Strong, was a successful businessman and philanthropist who served as Eastman Kodak's first president. His youngest uncle became a Forty-niners in the California Gold Rush, after losing both his wife and infant son. A first cousin twice removed, Theodore C. Achilles would later become a diplomat, another such cousin would marry Margaret Woodbury Strong, and a niece would marry George R. Carter.

Strong graduated from Yale College in 1857, having had a religious conversion during his time in college.  He began his theological studies at RTS and was awarded his D.D. in Germany.

Career
In August 1861. Strong was named pastor of First Baptist Church of Haverhill, Massachusetts.  After his short pastorate there, became pastor of First Church, Cleveland, OH in 1865, and thereafter became president of RTS. It was during his time as president that he wrote his seminal work, Systematic Theology.

Personal life
Strong was married, and his eldest son was the American psychologist and philosopher, Charles A. Strong.

He died on Tuesday, November 29, 1921 in Pasadena, California, after which his body was returned to Rochester, where he was laid to rest in the week following, at Mount Hope Cemetery on December 5, in his family's vault, after laying in state in Alvah Strong Hall at the Seminary. Among others, Strong was eulogized by Rush Rhees, then president of the University of Rochester, and by Clarence A. Barbour, a succeeding president of the Seminary.

Theology

Strong held a form of inclusivism, that is, he believed that some people from non-Christian religions actually believe in the one true God, the God revealed in the Bible. Thus, it was Strong's view that their faith in God—to the limits of their knowledge and their rejection of the religion around them—constituted "an implicit faith in Christ."

Selected works

References

External links
Guide to the Augustus Hopkins Strong Papers, Yale University 
Works by A. H. Strong at CCEL
 
 

1836 births
1921 deaths
Heads of universities and colleges in the United States
Baptist ministers from the United States
American Baptist theologians
Baptist writers
Religious leaders from Rochester, New York
Yale College alumni
Colgate Rochester Crozer Divinity School alumni
Colgate Rochester Crozer Divinity School faculty
Baptists from New York (state)